Westchester Hebrew High School (WHHS) is a private Jewish high school in Mamaroneck, New York, United States. It is the only co-educational Modern Orthodox Jewish high school in Westchester County.

Student body
The school enrolls students from New York State, Connecticut, and New Jersey. Within New York State, students originate from Westchester and Rockland counties, as well as New York City (including the Riverdale area of Bronx and Queens).

See also 
 Education in Westchester County
 The Leffell School (formerly Solomon Schechter School of Westchester), a K-12 Jewish day school affiliated with the Conservative Movement

References

External links
 Westchester Hebrew High School

Jewish day schools in New York (state)
Modern Orthodox Jewish day schools in the United States
Private high schools in Westchester County, New York